Museum of Science and Industry may refer to:

United States
 Museum of Science and Industry (Chicago), Illinois
 Museum of Science & Industry (Tampa), Florida
 California Museum of Science and Industry, Los Angeles
 Oregon Museum of Science and Industry, Portland, Oregon

United Kingdom
 Museum of Science and Industry, Birmingham, England
 Museum of Science and Industry (Manchester), England
 National Museum of Science and Industry, several British museums

See also 
 MOSI (disambiguation)